The Quincy Railroad  is a 3.27-mile terminal railroad located at Quincy, California. The QRR interchanges with the Union Pacific (former Western Pacific) at Quincy Junction in Plumas County, California, United States.

For many years, the Quincy operated a separate 23.3 mile branch running over former Southern Pacific branch from Wendel-Susanville, California which is now abandoned.

The railroad handles over 1,000 cars per year of outbound lumber and forest products.  The QRR is owned by Sierra Pacific Industries, which has a sawmill in Quincy.

The QRR has two locomotives: 
 QRR 5 is an EMD SW1200 built in November 1950 (Builder No. 13459)
 QRR 12 is an EMD SW7

Three earlier Quincy locomotives are now located at the nearby Western Pacific Railroad Museum:
 QRR 3 (a GE 44-ton switcher)
 QRR 4 (an ALCO S-1)
 QRR 1100 (an EMD TR6A)

Another earlier Quincy locomotive is currently at the Niles Canyon Railway:
 QRR 2 (an ALCO 2-6-2T)

References

California railroads
Switching and terminal railroads